The thrymsa was a gold coin minted in seventh-century Anglo-Saxon England. It originated as a copy of Merovingian tremisses and earlier Roman coins with a high gold content. Continued debasement between the 630s and the 650s reduced the gold content in newly minted coins such that after c. 655 the percentage of gold in a new coin was less than 35%. The thrymsa ceased to be minted after about 675 and was superseded by the silver sceat.

History

The first thrymsas were minted in England in the 630s. These earliest coins were created at mints in Canterbury, London, and perhaps also Winchester. Charles Arnold-Baker in his Companion to British History suggests that the impetus for the creation of this coin was increased commerce following the marriage of Æthelberht of Kent and Bertha of Kent, a daughter of the Frankish king Charibert I. Thrymsas originally contained between 40% and 70% gold, but following continued debasement those coins minted after c. 655 contained less than 35% gold. Gold coins ceased to be minted completely by about 675, after which the silver sceat was minted instead. The term thrymsa is used in later Anglo-Saxon texts to refer to a value of four silver pennies. Thrymsas are known to modern numismatists through their discovery in various hoards, notably the Crondall Hoard. The ship-burial at Sutton Hoo, which dates from the early seventh-century contained 37 Merovingian tremisses but no Anglo-Saxon coins. The Crondall hoard by contrast, dated to after c. 630, contained 101 gold coins, of which 69 were Anglo-Saxon and 24 were Merovingian or Frankish.

Design
Early thrymsas were imitations of Merovingian tremisses or earlier Roman coins. Later thrymsas feature various different designs, including busts, crosses, lyre-like objects and Roman legionary ensigns. Inscriptions are also common features, and sometimes appear in Latin script and sometimes in Anglo-Saxon runes.

See also

History of the English penny (c. 600 – 1066)
Coinage in Anglo-Saxon England

Gallery
Comparison of continental and English coins:

Notes

References

Citations

Sources

Anglo-Saxon money
Gold coins